Birth of the Sun is a 2002 album released by bassist Marcel Jacob credited as Rising Force. It consists of early recordings of Yngwie J. Malmsteen, and his band Rising Force. Shortly after Birth of the Sun was released, Yngwie released The Genesis, an album featuring most of the same tracks, but with Marcel Jacob's tracks redone.

Track listing
All songs written by Yngwie J. Malmsteen except where indicated.
 "Merlin's Castle"
 "Birth of the Sun"
 "Speed and Action"
 "Dying Man"
 "Suite Opus III"
 "Voodoo Nights"

Personnel
Yngwie J. Malmsteen – guitars
Marcel Jacob – bass
Zepp Urgard – drums

Heavy metal albums by Swedish artists
Yngwie Malmsteen albums
2002 albums